Rabshakeh (Akkadian: 𒃲𒁉𒈜𒈨𒌍 rab šāqê [GAL.BI.LUL.MEŠ]; ;  Rapsakēs; ; ; alternative spellings include Rab-shakeh, Rabsaces, or Rab shaqe) is a title meaning "chief of the princes/cup-bearers" in the Semitic Akkadian and Aramaic languages. The title was given to the chief cup-bearer or the vizier of the Akkadian, Assyrian and Babylonian royal courts in ancient Mesopotamia, and revived by the Assyrians as a military rank during World War I.

Biblical accounts
The Hebrew Bible mentions it for one of Sennacherib's messengers to Hezekiah, who was sent to Jerusalem along with the Tartan and the Rabsaris. The speech he delivered, in the Hebrew language, in the hearing of all the people, as he stood near the wall on the north side of the city, is quoted in 2 Kings  and in Isaiah .

References

History of Assyria
Court titles
Executive ministers
Books of Kings people